Lybid (Ukrainian: Либідь) is a planned Ukrainian geostationary telecommunications satellite designed as part of the National Satellite System of Ukraine.

The launch of the satellite has been repeatedly postponed (since 2011) due to various problems including: financial mismanagement, corrupt officials stealing project funds, unmet obligations to contractors and lenders, the loss of a rocket engine that went missing in transit under suspicious circumstances, and the loss of control over the satellite control center in Yevpatoria due to the Russian annexation of Crimea. Currently, the satellite is stored in Russia.

At the end of 2019, Volodymyr Usov, the newly appointed head of the State Space Agency of Ukraine, said the project most likely will be closed. In an interview conducted in April 2021, Usov said that the Agency was still looking for an investor to facilitate the completion of the project without additional funds from the state budget.

Mission 
The satellite is intended to provide services of regional and foreign television and radio broadcasting, direct television broadcasting, the provision of multimedia and Internet services, as well as data transmission, telephony, video conferencing and the Internet, based on VSAT. Satellite coverage includes Eastern Europe, parts of Asia, and the Middle East.

The spacecraft will have 24 Ku-band transponders installed. The power of each transponder will be 100–110 watts.

Manufactures 
The main contractor and developer of the payload is a Canadian company MacDonald, Dettwiler and Associates Ltd. (MDA).

The subcontractor is JSC Information Satellite Systems Reshetnev.

See also 

 Space program of Ukraine

References 

Satellites of Ukraine
Cancelled spacecraft
2010s in Ukraine